Sabrina Cakmakli (born November 25, 1994 in Immenstadt im Allgäu) is a German freestyle skier, specializing in halfpipe and slopestyle.

Career
Cakmakli competed at the 2014 Winter Olympics for Germany. She placed 14th in the qualifying round in the halfpipe, failing to advance.

As of September 2015, her best showing at the World Championships is 5th, in the 2015 halfpipe.

Cakmakli made her World Cup debut in August 2013. As of September 2015, she has one World Cup podium finish, a silver in a halfpipe event at Park City in 2014–15. Her best World Cup overall finish in a discipline is 5th, in the 2014–15 halfpipe.

World Cup Podiums

References

External links
 
 
 
 

1994 births
Living people
Olympic freestyle skiers of Germany
Freestyle skiers at the 2014 Winter Olympics
Freestyle skiers at the 2018 Winter Olympics
Freestyle skiers at the 2022 Winter Olympics
People from Immenstadt
Sportspeople from Swabia (Bavaria)
German people of Turkish descent
German female freestyle skiers
21st-century German women